The Elk Hair Caddis is a dry fly commonly used for trout fishing. The Elk Hair Caddis was created by Pennsylvania fly tyer Al Troth in 1957. He is considered a pioneer in the sport of fly fishing for this invention.

Imitates
The Elk Hair Caddis is considered a searching type pattern as it resembles the general form of adult caddisflies or small stoneflies. Troth created the pattern and first fished it in 1957 on Loyalsock Creek in eastern Pennsylvania. The fly was inspired by several palmered flies Troth like to fish and G. E. M. Skues' Little Red Sedge fly which featured a hair wing.  Originally tied to imitate the Green Caddis hatch, the Elk Hair Caddis has since been tied in a variety of wing, hackle and body colors to simulate different caddis and small stoneflies.

Materials
John Gierach explains the materials he uses to create the original Elk Hair Caddis. For a hook he uses the Mustad 94840 ranging from sizes 12-18. Then he uses a dubbed body, palmer hackle, elk hair wings, and a small head to close out the fly.

Elk Hair Caddis for steelhead
The Elk Hair Caddis is not limited to trout fishing. This fly is also very useful when fishing for steelhead. Steelhead are the anadromous form (sea-run) of rainbow trout which means some alterations to the standard Elk Hair Caddis are necessary. The hook size should vary from size 6-10. The legs should be a medium grade hackle (non webby, but not dry-fly either).The body could be either vernille, furry foam, coarse bodied dubbing, sparkle braid, or four strand floss. The wings should be made from natural elk hair with the ends clipped short. An optional aspect of the Elk Hair Caddis for steelhead would be a flash. A flash is just a few strands of subtle translucent material placed underneath the wing.

References

Dry fly patterns